Make Me Happy is a 1935 German musical comedy film directed by Arthur Robison and starring Julia Serda, Albert Lieven and Richard Romanowsky. It was made by Germany's largest film company UFA. A separate French-language version Les époux célibataires was released, also directed by Robison. It was shot at the Babelsberg Studios in Berlin. The film's sets were designed by the art director Otto Hunte and Willy Schiller.

Cast
 Julia Serda as Mrs. Patricia Davenport
 Albert Lieven as William Davenport, her son
 Richard Romanowsky as Lawyer Murphy, her brother
 Harald Paulsen as Henry Davenport, Revueschauspieler
 Ursula Grabley as Fleurette Legrand, seine Partnerin
 Else Elster as Cherry, ein Revuegirl
 Ralph Arthur Roberts as Der Revuedirektor
 Adele Sandrock as Die Garderobiere
 Otto Sauter-Sarto as Der Farmer
 Maria Loja as Seine Frau
 Traute Bengen as Revuegirl
 Emil Biron as Schiffssteward
 Egon Brosig as Barmann
 Fritz Draeger as Reporter
 Anita Düwell as Revuegirl
 Max Harry Ernst as Tänzer in der Schiffsbar
 Fred Goebel as Schiffssteward
 Hedi Höpfner as Tanzpartnerin
 Margot Höpfner as Tanzpartnerin
 Carl Iban as Maskenbildner
 Antonie Jaeckel as Gast bei Lady Davenport
 Alfred Karen as Tänzer in der Schiffsbar
 Jochen Kuhlmey as Matrose
 Paul Luka as Filmregisseur
 Sophie Pagay as Helma
 Klaus Pohl as Cinematographer
 Edlef Schauer as Boy auf dem Schiff
 Wera Schultz as Gast bei Lady Davenport
 Elisabeth von Ruets as Gast bei Lady Davenport
 Ewald Wenck as Theaterinspizient
 Max Wilmsen as Schiffsoffizier

References

Bibliography

External links 
 

1935 films
Films of Nazi Germany
German musical comedy films
1935 musical comedy films
1930s German-language films
Films directed by Arthur Robison
UFA GmbH films
German multilingual films
German black-and-white films
1935 multilingual films
1930s German films
Films shot at Babelsberg Studios